Karyn Ellen Polito (born November 11, 1966) is an American attorney, businesswoman, and politician who served as the 72nd lieutenant governor of Massachusetts from 2015 to 2023. Polito was a Republican member of the Massachusetts House of Representatives for the 11th Worcester district from 2001 to 2011. Polito was first elected lieutenant governor in 2014 with her running mate, Charlie Baker. They were both re-elected in 2018, and declined to seek reelection in 2022.

Early life and education
Polito is a lifelong resident of Shrewsbury, Massachusetts. She graduated from Holy Name Central Catholic High School. Shortly after graduating from Boston College with a Bachelor of Science degree in 1988, she received her Juris Doctor from New England Law in 1991.

Career 
An attorney, Polito co-owns and operates a commercial real estate development firm.

Polito is a member of the Republican Party. Her experience in politics and government includes stints as a Shrewsbury Town Meeting member (1993-2000), a member of the Shrewsbury Zoning Board of Appeals (1994-1995), and a Shrewsbury selectman (1995-1998). Polito was the commissioner of the Massachusetts Lottery from 1999 to 2000.

Massachusetts House of Representatives
In 2000, Polito was elected State Representative for the 11th district of Worcester, which covers the town of Shrewsbury and precincts 1 and 4 of the adjacent town of Westborough in Worcester County. She served in the Massachusetts House of Representatives from 2001 to 2011, winning every election without any opposition.

2010 state treasurer campaign
On March 1, 2010, Polito announced she would run for the office of treasurer and receiver-general of Massachusetts. She was unopposed in the Republican primary. Polito lost in the general election to Democratic candidate Steve Grossman, but won 45% of the vote, receiving the most votes of any Republican running for office in Massachusetts in 2010.

Lieutenant governor of Massachusetts

2014 campaign

On December 3, 2013, Polito announced her candidacy for Lieutenant Governor of Massachusetts. The leading GOP candidate for Governor, Charlie Baker, endorsed her candidacy. She was not opposed in the September 2014 primary. Baker and Polito won the 2014 gubernatorial election, defeating Democratic candidates Martha Coakley and Steve Kerrigan, respectively, 48.40% to 46.54%.

2018 campaign

In August 2018, Baker and Polito formally launched their re-election campaign. Both were successful in the Republican primary election held on September 4, 2018, with Polito running unopposed. Baker and Polito faced challengers Jay Gonzalez and Quentin Palfrey of the Democratic Party in the general election. The Baker/Polito ticket defeated the Gonzales/Palfrey ticket by a margin of 1,781,341 votes to 885,770.

Issues and record
Karyn Polito has been described as a socially moderate Republican who is generally conservative on most other issues. On the Issues, a non-partisan organization that records a politician's position on issues, considers her to be a "Moderate Conservative." Polito did not vote for President Donald Trump in 2016 and announced that she did not support Trump's re-election.

Polito has supported term limits and eliminating state pensions for elected officials.
She has been supportive of state tax cuts.
She said she is proud of her pro-choice record, noting high ratings from NARAL Pro-Choice America and Planned Parenthood.
 Polito had an A+ rating from Gun Owners' Action League (GOAL), and an A rating from the National Rifle Association.
 As State Representative in 2007, Polito voted yes on a constitutional amendment defining marriage as between one man and one woman. She did support same-sex civil unions. In 2013, however, Polito reversed her position and expressed public support for same-sex marriage. 
Polito opposed Donald Trump's executive order to build a wall on the southern border of the United States.

Personal life 
Polito resides in Shrewsbury, Massachusetts with her husband, Stephan M. Rodolakis, and their two children. Rodolakis is an attorney specializing in bankruptcy proceedings.

Electoral history

See also
List of female lieutenant governors in the United States

References

External links

 Lieutenant Governor Karyn Polito official government website
 About Lieutenant Governor Polito official campaign website
 Karyn Polito for Lieutenant Governor (archived)
 

|-

|-

|-

1966 births
20th-century American lawyers
20th-century American women
21st-century American politicians
21st-century American women politicians
American people of Italian descent
Boston College alumni
Lieutenant Governors of Massachusetts
Living people
Massachusetts lawyers
Republican Party members of the Massachusetts House of Representatives
New England Law Boston alumni
People from Shrewsbury, Massachusetts
Women state legislators in Massachusetts